South Carolina Highway 555 (SC 555) is a  primary state highway in the U.S. state of South Carolina. It serves as an alternate route from downtown Columbia to Blythewood.

Route description

SC 555 traverses  from SC 12 in downtown Columbia to U.S. Route 21 (US 21) near Blythewood. Before Interstate 77 (I-77) was completed in the area, SC 555 served as a major thoroughfare; today it is an alternate route.  The highway is four lanes south of I-77 and two lanes north of it.

History

The highway was established in 1941 or 1942 as a new primary routing traveling from SC 12 to US 21.  Between 1948 and 1952, the highway was downgraded to secondary status until entire length was paved.  SC 555 was widened to four lanes in phases: SC 12 to SC 16 by 1964, to I-20 by 1970, and finally to I-77 by 1982.

Major junctions

See also

References

External links

SC 555 at Virginia Highways' South Carolina Highways Annex

555
Transportation in Richland County, South Carolina
Transportation in Columbia, South Carolina